The 2014–15 Detroit Titans men's basketball team represented the University of Detroit Mercy in the 2014–15 NCAA Division I men's basketball season. Their head coach was Ray McCallum in his 7th season. The Titans played their home games at Calihan Hall and were members of the Horizon League. They finished the season 15–18, 7–9 in Horizon League play to finish in sixth place. They lost in the quarterfinals of the Horizon League tournament to Cleveland State.

Roster

Schedule

|-
!colspan=9 style=| Exhibition

|-
!colspan=9 style=| Regular season

|-
!colspan=9 style=| Horizon League tournament

References

Detroit Titans
Detroit Mercy Titans men's basketball seasons
Detroit Titans men's b
Detroit Titans men's b